= Bernd Bruegge =

German computer scientist

Bernd Bruegge (German: Bernd Brügge) (born 1951) is a German computer scientist, full professor at the Technical University of Munich (TUM) and the head of the Chair for Applied Software Engineering. He is also an adjunct associate professor at Carnegie Mellon University (CMU) in Pittsburgh.

== Biography ==
Born in 1951, Bruegge received a bachelor's degree in computer science at the University of Hamburg in 1978, a master's degree in computer science from Carnegie Mellon University in 1982 and a PhD degree in computer science from Carnegie Mellon University in 1985.

Bruegge has been a professor at the Technical University of Munich in Munich since 1997. From 2000 to 2003, he was a member of the Deutsche Telekom research committee. He has been a member of the research committee of Munich district (German: Münchner Kreis), a nonprofit association, since 2003 and member of the CIO Colloquium scientific advisory board since 2009. Bruegge is also the liaison professor for the German National Academic Foundation (German: Studienstiftung des Deutschen Volkes).

== Work ==
His principal research areas are Modeling and semantics, Computational intelligence and Machine learning, Knowledge Management and representation, Process support and human factors, and Process models and methodologies

== Publications ==
Bernd Bruegge is the author of the following books:

- Bernd Bruegge, Allen Dutoit: Object-Oriented Software Engineering: Using UML, Patterns and Java (Third Edition). Prentice Hall, 2009. ISBN 978-0136061250.
- Eva-Maria Kern, Heinz-Gerd Hegering, Bernd Brügge: Managing Development and Application of Digital Technologies. Springer. 2006. ISBN 3-540-34128-5.

He is also the author of many academic papers, for example:

- Stephan Krusche, Dora Dzvonyar, Han Xu and Bernd Bruegge. Software Theater — Teaching Demo Oriented Prototyping. Transactions on Computing Education. ACM Journal. 2018
- Stephan Krusche, Bernd Bruegge, Irina Camilleri, Kirill Krinkin, Andreas Seitz and Cecil Wöbker. Chaordic Learning: A Case Study. 39th International Conference on Software Engineering (ICSE'17), Software Engineering Education and Training, pages 87–96. ACM. Buenos Aires - Argentina, May 2017
- Stephan Krusche, Andreas Seitz, Jürgen Börstler and Bernd Bruegge. Interactive Learning – Increasing Student Participation through Shorter Exercise Cycles. 19th Australasian Computing Education Conference (ACE'17), pages 17–26. ACM. Geelong - Australia, January 2017
- Bernd Bruegge, Stephan Krusche and Lukas Alperowitz. Software Engineering Project Courses with Industrial Clients. Transactions on Computing Education 15(4), pages 17:1-17:31. ACM Journal. 2015
- Bernd Bruegge, Allen Dutoit, Timo Wolf. Sysiphus: Enabling informal collaboration in global software development. In the proceedings of the International Conference on Global Software Engineering (ICGSE) 2006.
- Martin Bauer, Bernd Bruegge, et al. Design of a component-based augmented reality framework. In the Proceedings of IEEE and ACM International Symposium on Augmented Reality. 2001.
- Bernd Bruegge, Allen Dutoit, et al. Transatlantic project courses in a university environment. In the Proceedings of the 7th Asia-Pacific Software Engineering Conference (APSEC), 2000.
- Allen Dutoit, Bernd Bruegge. Communication metrics for software development. IEEE Transactions on Software Engineering, 24(8), pp. 615–628. 1998.
- Bernd Bruegge, Allen Dutoit. Communication metrics for software development. In the proceedings of the 19th ACM International Conference on Software Engineering (ICSE), 1997.
- Bernd Bruegge, Ben Bennington. Applications of mobile computing and communication. IEEE Personal Communications, 3(1), pp. 64–71. 1996.
- Bernd Bruegge, Robert Coyne. Teaching iterative and collaborative design: lessons and directions. Software Engineering Education, Springer, pp. 411–427, 1994.
- Bernd Bruegge, Tim Gottschalk, Bin Luo. A framework for dynamic program analyzers. In ACM SIGPLAN Notices, 28(10), 1993.
- Bernd Bruegge, Jim Blythe, et al. Object-oriented system modeling with OMT. In ACM SIGPLAN Notices, 27(10), pp. 359–376. 1992.
- Bernd Bruegge, Peter Hibbard. Generalized path expressions: A high-level debugging mechanism. Journal of Systems and Software, 3(4), pp. 265–276. 1983.
- Bernd Bruegge. Teaching an industry-oriented software engineering course. Software Engineering Education, Springer, pp. 63–87, 1992.
